The 2010 Colgate Raiders football team was an American football team that represented Colgate University during the 2010 NCAA Division I FCS football season. Colgate tied for second in the Patriot League. 

In its 15th season under head coach Dick Biddle, the team compiled a 7–4 record. Greg Sullivan was the team captain. 

The Raiders outscored opponents 314 to 240. Their 3–2 conference record tied with Holy Cross for second-best in the Patriot League standings. Colgate's season-ending win over Fordham did not count in its league record, as Fordham had been disqualified from the championship after admitting scholarship players. 

Colgate was ranked No. 22 in the preseason national top 25, but a close opening-week win over unranked Monmouth dropped them to No. 25, and the subsequent loss to Furman saw them eliminated from the rankings altogether. The Raiders remained unranked for the rest of the year.

The team played its home games at Andy Kerr Stadium in Hamilton, New York.

Schedule

References

Colgate
Colgate Raiders football seasons
Colgate Raiders football